Black bream may refer to one of several fish species:

 Black drummer, Girella elevata
 Black seabream, Spondyliosoma cantharus, a silvery fish found in northern Europe and the Mediterranean
 Galjoen, Dichistius capensis, the national fish of South Africa
 Macquarie perch, Macquaria australasica, an Australian native freshwater fish of the Murray-Darling river system
 Parore, Girella tricuspidata, a sea chub of the family Kyphosidae
 Sooty grunter, Hephaestus fuliginosus, found in rivers of Queensland and Northern Territory
 Southern black bream, Acanthopagrus butcheri of the family Sparidae, endemic to Australia
 Surf bream, Acanthopagrus australis of the family Sparidae, found off eastern Australia
 Japanese black porgy, Acanthopagrus schlegelii of the family Sparidae

See also 
 Bream
 Yellowfin bream (disambiguation)
 Bream (disambiguation)
 Black Amur bream, a species of ray-finned fish in the genus Megalobrama

Fish common names